Khorolsky is a rural locality (a settlement) in Nizhnekamenskoye Rural Settlement, Talovsky District, Voronezh Oblast, Russia. The population was 128 as of 2010. There are 3 streets.

Geography 
Khorolsky is located 17 km southeast of Talovaya (the district's administrative centre) by road. Serikovo is the nearest rural locality.

References 

Rural localities in Talovsky District